Jonah Charles Wilcox (19 January 1894 – 5 August 1956) was an English professional footballer. His clubs included Bristol City, New Brighton, Bristol Rovers and Gillingham. He made over 200 Football League appearances.

References

1894 births
1956 deaths
English footballers
Association football forwards
Abertillery Town F.C. players
Bradford (Park Avenue) A.F.C. players
Gillingham F.C. players
New Brighton A.F.C. players
Bristol City F.C. players
Queens Park Rangers F.C. players
Bristol Rovers F.C. players
Kidderminster Harriers F.C. players
English Football League players